Feignies is a commune in the Nord department in northern France.

Feignies is twinned with the English village of Keyworth.

Population

Heraldry

See also
Communes of the Nord department
 Fort de Leveau

References

Communes of Nord (French department)